The Giants of Jazz was a jazz all-star group of the 1970s which featured Art Blakey (drums), Dizzy Gillespie (trumpet), Al McKibbon (bass), Thelonious Monk (piano), Sonny Stitt (alto and tenor sax), and Kai Winding (trombone). They recorded albums for Atlantic Records, Concord Records. and Emarcy Records.

Discography
The Giants of Jazz (Atlantic, 1971)

American jazz ensembles
Jazz supergroups
Musical groups established in 1970